Darcy Lang (born 21 November 1995) is an Australian rules footballer. He played for seven years in the Australian Football League, with Geelong and Carlton.

Darcy grew up in Colac, Victoria and played for Victoria Country in the 2013 AFL Under 18 Championships, where he suffered a broken leg.

He made his debut for Geelong in the round 13 win against  in 2014. He played a total of 44 matches for Geelong over four seasons.

On the second last day of the 2017 trade period, Lang confirmed his desire to move to Carlton. He was officially traded to Carlton the next day. He made his Carlton debut in Round 8, 2018 against , and kicked a goal with his first kick in a Carlton jumper, less than a minute into the game. He was a fringe player across his first two seasons with the club, playing 19 games, but played only one game in his final season, 2020, and battled ankle injuries during his time at the club. he was delisted at the end of the 2020 season.

After being delisted, Lang played for Waratah in the 2020/21 Northern Territory Football League summer season. He will return to Geelong after signing as a VFL-listed player with its reserves team in 2021.

Statistics
Statistics are correct to the end of round 15, 2019.

|- style="background:#EAEAEA"
| scope="row" text-align:center | 2014
| 
| 11 || 1 || 1 || 1 || 5 || 2 || 7 || 2 || 6 || 1.0 || 1.0 || 5.0 || 2.0 || 7.0 || 2.0 || 6.0 
|-
| scope="row" text-align:center | 2015
| 
| 11 || 20 || 14 || 5 || 151 || 120 || 271 || 63 || 55 || 0.7 || 0.3 || 7.6 || 6.0 || 13.6 || 3.2 || 2.8 
|- style="background:#EAEAEA"
| scope="row" text-align:center | 2016
| 
| 11 || 13 || 10 || 6 || 102 || 82 || 184 || 46 || 36 || 0.8 || 0.5 || 7.9 || 6.3 || 14.2 || 3.5 || 2.8 
|-
| scope="row" text-align:center | 2017
| 
| 11 || 10 || 6 || 9 || 75 || 84 || 159 || 31 || 54 || 0.6 || 0.9 || 7.5 || 8.4 || 15.9 || 3.1 || 5.4 
|- style="background:#EAEAEA"
| scope="row" text-align:center | 2018
| 
| 16 || 11 || 6 || 2 || 94 || 58 || 152 || 44 || 40 || 0.5 || 1.2 || 8.6 || 5.3 || 13.8 || 4.0 || 3.6 
|-
| scope="row" text-align:center | 2019
| 
| 16 || 1 || 0 || 2 || 4 || 4 || 8 || 3 || 2 || 0.0 || 2.0 || 4.0 || 4.0 || 8.0 || 3.0 || 2.0 
|- class="sortbottom"
! colspan=3 | Career
! 56 
! 37 
! 25 
! 431 
! 350 
! 781 
! 189 
! 193 
! 0.7 
! 0.5 
! 7.7 
! 6.3 
! 14.0 
! 3.4 
! 3.5 
|}

References

External links

1995 births
Living people
Carlton Football Club players
Preston Football Club (VFA) players
Geelong Football Club players
Australian rules footballers from Victoria (Australia)
Geelong Falcons players
Waratah Football Club players
People from Colac, Victoria